The chemical agent used in the Moscow theatre hostage crisis of 23 October 2002 has never been definitively revealed by the Russian authorities, though many possible identities have been speculated. An undisclosed incapacitating agent was used by the Russian authorities in order to subdue the Chechen terrorists who had taken control of a crowded theater.

Suspected agent
At the time, the agent was surmised to be some sort of surgical anesthetic or chemical weapon.  Afterwards, there were numerous speculations about the identity of the substance that was used to end the siege.  Several chemicals were proposed, such as the tranquilizer diazepam (Valium), the anticholinergic BZ, the highly potent oripavine-derived Bentley-series opioid etorphine, another highly potent opioid, such as a fentanyl or an analogue thereof, such as 3-methylfentanil, and the anaesthetic halothane.  Foreign embassies in Moscow issued official requests for more information on the gas to aid in treatment, but were publicly ignored. While still refusing to identify the gas, on October 28, 2002 the Russian government informed the U.S. Embassy of some of the gas' effects. Based on this information and examinations of victims, doctors suggested that the compound might be a morphine derivative.

The Russian media reported the drug was Kolokol-1, either mefentanyl or α-methylfentanil dissolved in a halothane base.

It was reported that efforts to treat victims were complicated because the Russian government refused to inform doctors what type of gas had been used. In the records of the official investigation of the act, the agent is referred to as a certain "gaseous substance", in other cases it is referred to as an "unidentified chemical substance".

Opioid version
Two days after the incident, on October 30, 2002, Russia responded to increasing domestic and international pressure with a statement on the unknown gas by Health Minister Yuri Shevchenko. He said that the gas was a  fentanyl derivative, an extremely powerful opioid.  Boris Grebenyuk, the All-Russia Disaster Relief Service chief, said the services used trimethyl phentanylum (3-methylfentanyl, a fentanyl analog that is about 1000 times more potent than morphine, which was manufactured and abused in the former Soviet Union); New Scientist pointed out that 3-methylfentanyl is not a gas but an aerosol.

Clothing samples from British survivors of the attack showed the presence of the narcotics remifentanil and carfentanil. The same study detected norcarfentanil in another survivor's urine. A German toxicology professor who examined several German hostages said that their blood and urine contained halothane, a once-common inhalation anaesthetic which is now seldom used in Western countries, and that it was likely the gas had additional components. However, halothane has a strong odor (although often defined as "pleasant" by comparison with other anesthetic gases). Thus, by the time the whole theatre area would be filled with halothane to a concentration compatible with loss of consciousness (0.5–3%), it is likely that Chechens inside would have realized they were being attacked. Additionally, recovery of consciousness is rapid after the flow of gas is interrupted, unlike with high-dose fentanyl administration. Therefore, although halothane might have been a component in the aerosol, it was probably not a major component, or perhaps it was a metabolite of another drug. Some of the later publications in medical journals assumed that Russian special forces used aerosol of a fentanyl derivative, such as carfentanil, and an inhalational anesthetic, such as halothane "

Other theories

Newspapers
Writing in the Moscow daily Komsomolskaya Pravda, Viktor Baranets, a former Russian Defense Ministry official, stated that the Ministry of the Interior knew that any normal riot control agent, such as pepper spray or tear gas, would allow the Chechens time to harm the hostages. They decided to use the strongest agent available. The paper identified the material as a KGB-developed "psycho-chemical gas" known as Kolokol-1, and reported that "the gas had such an influence on [Chechen siege leader Movsar] Barayev that he couldn't get up from [his] desk". Russian doctors who helped hostages in the first minutes after the siege used a common antidote to fentanyl, naloxone, by injection. But the effects of the fentanyl derivative's application, which can exacerbate   chronic diseases,  grew acute for the hostages, who had stayed in a closed space without water and food for several days.

Although the exact nature of the active chemical has not been verified, the Russian language newspaper Gazeta.ru claimed that the chemical used had been 3-methylfentanyl, attributing this information to "experts from the Moscow State University chemistry department."

Zilker and Wheelis
Prof. Thomas Zilker and Dr. Mark Wheelis, interviewed for the BBC's Horizon documentary series, dispute that the gas could have been based on fentanyl.

Thomas Zilker: It seems to be different from fentanyl, carfentanil and sufentanil, but it has to be, it has to have the potency of carfentanil at least because otherwise it wouldn’t work in this circumstance. So the Russians obviously have designed a new fentanyl which we cannot detect in the west.

Mark Wheelis: The fact that the Russians did it and got away with a lethality of less than twenty percent suggests to me that very likely there may have been a novel agent with a higher safety margin than normal fentanyl.

Riches et al.
In 2012, Riches et al. found evidence from liquid chromatography-tandem mass spectrometry analysis of extracts of clothing from two British survivors, and urine from a third survivor, that the aerosol was a mixture carfentanil and remifentanil the exact proportions of which they could not determine.  Assuming that these were the only active constituents (which has not been verified by the Russian military), the primary acute toxic effect to the theatre victims would have been opioid-induced apnea; in this case mechanical ventilation and/or treatment with naloxone, the specific antidote for poisoning with carfentanil in humans, would have been life-saving for many or all victims.

References

External links
, ResearchGate, December 2014.
Gas 'killed Moscow hostages', BBC News, 27 October 2002
Hostages given military's nerve gas antidote, The Guardian, October 28, 2002
What was the gas?, BBC News, 28 October 2002
Gas enters counterterror arsenal, The Christian Science Monitor, October 29, 2002
German doctors identify gas used in Russian hostage rescue, CBC News, October 29, 2002
US identifies deadly Moscow siege gas, BBC News, 29 October 2002
Russia names Moscow siege gas, CNN, October 30, 2002

Incapacitating agents
Moscow theater hostage crisis
Chemical weapons attacks